Bhagat Parmanand 
() was a Vaishnava mystic and saint-poet, one of whose hymns is included in the Guru Granth Sahib.

Early Life
Born in Kannauj, Uttarpradesh, in a Gaur Brahmin Family in 1483, he is believed to have resided at Kannauj.

Legacy
Parmãnand was a devotee of Vishnu and used in his songs the nom de plume Sarañg, the name of a bird ever thirsty for the raindrop.
Parmanand always longed for God whom he worshiped in the Vaishnavite manifestation of Krsna. He used to make, it is said, seven hundred genuflections daily to God on his uncovered, often bleeding, knees. He believe for a long time that God could be worshiped as an Image only, He was the great devotee of lord Shri Nath ji (another name of Shri Krishna).shri Vallabhacbarya was his Guru. Parmanand Das belonged to pushti sampraday. Another Bhakt Surdas ji was his Guru Bhai. Parmanand das ji and Surdas ji both take initiation from the same guru i. e. shri vallabhacharya ji. Parmanand's one hymn incorporated in the Guru Granth Sahib (p. 1253) subscribes to this view. In this hymn, he disapproves of the ritualistic reading and hearing of the sacred books If that has not disposed to the service of fellow beings. He commends sincere devotion which could be imbibed from the company of holy saints. Lust, wrath, avarice, slander have to be expunged for they render all seva, i.e. service, fruitless.

Poetry
This is the 1 Shabad from Parmanand in the Sri Guru Granth Sahib:
 SGGS Page 1253

 Parmanand was the follower of vishnu.

References

 Excerpts taken from Encyclopedia of Sikhism by Harbans Singh. Published by Punjabi University, Patiala
 The Sikh Religion, Vol 6,, Max Arthur MacAuliff,  Oxford University Press, 1909.

Sikh Bhagats
Indian male poets
15th-century Indian poets